Cape May Winery & Vineyard is a winery in Lower Township in Cape May County, New Jersey. It is outside of the North Cape May census-designated place, though sometimes its address is stated as a "North Cape May" address. Patriot-News described it as being in North Cape May.

The vineyard was first planted in 1992, and opened to the public in 1995. Cape May Winery is one of the larger winegrowers in New Jersey, having 25 acres of grapes under cultivation, and producing 11,000 cases of wine per year. The winery is named for the region where it is located.

Wines
Cape May Winery is in the Outer Coastal Plain AVA, and produces wine from Albariño, Cabernet Franc, Cabernet Sauvignon, Cayuga White,  Chambourcin, Chardonnay, Colombard, Merlot, Pinot gris, Pinot noir, Riesling, Sauvignon blanc, Syrah, Vidal blanc, Viognier, and Zinfandel grapes. Cape May Winery also produces wine from apples, and has a separate brand named "Issac Smith" after an 1820s coffin maker who lived by where the winery currently operates.

Licensing and associations
Cape May Winery has a plenary winery license from the New Jersey Division of Alcoholic Beverage Control, which allows it to produce an unrestricted amount of wine, operate up to 15 off-premises sales rooms, and ship up to 12 cases per year to consumers in-state or out-of-state. The winery is a member of the Garden State Wine Growers Association and the Outer Coastal Plain Vineyard Association.

See also 
Alcohol laws of New Jersey
American wine
Judgment of Princeton
List of wineries, breweries, and distilleries in New Jersey
New Jersey Farm Winery Act
New Jersey Wine Industry Advisory Council
New Jersey wine

References

External links 

Garden State Wine Growers Association
Outer Coastal Plain Vineyard Association

Wineries in New Jersey
Tourist attractions in Cape May County, New Jersey
1995 establishments in New Jersey
Lower Township, New Jersey